Farida Jalal (born Farida Sami; 18 May 1950) is an Indian actress who primarily worked in Hindi films. In a film career spanning almost fifty years, Jalal appeared in over 200 films. Best known for her character-driven roles in independent cinema and supporting work in mainstream Bollywood productions, Jalal has received such accolades as four Filmfare Awards and two Bengal Film Journalists Association Awards.

Jalal started her career with Taqdeer (1967). She went on to play leading and supporting roles in numerous motion pictures through the 1970s and early 80s. She is widely remembered for her roles in Paras (1971), Henna (1991) and Dilwale Dulhania Le Jayenge (1995), all of which garnered the Filmfare Award for Best Supporting Actress. She became a household name after portraying motherly roles and strong female characters in the 1990s and the early 2000s. She has also won the Filmfare Critics Award for Best Performance for her role in Mammo (1994). She won the Best Actress Award at the 2012 Harlem International Film Festival for her role in A Gran Plan (2012).

She has successfully transitioned to numerous shows on Indian television alongside her work in films. Some of her notable works are the sitcom Yeh Jo Hai Zindagi, Dekh Bhai Dekh, Shararat and Ammaji Ki Galli. She was seen in Zee TV's Satrangi Sasural portraying the role of Gomti Vatsal  Dadi Maa and famous for Naani's role in Star Plus's Shararat.

Career 
Farida Jalal, who was born on 18 May 1950 in Mumbai India, started her career in the 1960s when she won the United Film Producers Talent Hunt sponsored by Filmfare in 1965. She, along with Rajesh Khanna was chosen as a finalist and both were presented on stage as winners at the Filmfare Awards function. She got her first film offer for Taqdeer from Tarachand Barjatya who happened to be in the audience. In an interview in 2014, she said, when asked her about the initial part of her career: "I started my acting career when I was just out of my school St Joseph's Convent in Panchgani, in a film called Taqdeer. I took part in a talent contest and even won. Kaka (Rajesh Khanna) and I were the finalists. How was I to know that I'd soon be doing a film Aradhana with him?".

She usually played the sister or rejected fiancée of the male lead, but almost never the female lead. One of her most critically acclaimed roles is in Bobby, where she played the part of a mentally disabled would-be fiancée of Rishi Kapoor. During the 1980s, her roles progressed from sister and girlfriend to aunt, mother, or grandmother. She is also remembered for her part in Aradhana, in which she plays Rajesh Khanna's girlfriend, and sings the song "Baagon mein baahar hai, kaliyon pe nikhaar hai" (loosely translated as "The gardens are fine, the buds are out).

When asked as to how she started getting typecast as a hero's sister, she quoted in an interview: "It all started with Gopi where I was offered the greatest Mr Dilip Kumar's sister's role. Forget about refusing, I jumped at the offer. Even if I had the chance to just go and observe him on the set I'd have done it. I love the man. I remember during those days each and every actor was copying Dilip Saab whether it was Dharmendra, Jeetendra, or Manoj Kumar. I was much in demand as Dilip Saab's sister. Every hero wanted the same. Every actor wanted me to play his sister. Sometimes the sister was the film's heroine. The official heroine would just sing her songs, whereas I had all the dramatic scenes. I got my recognition and the awards. In a film called Paras I was Sanjeev Kumar's sister. But I had a lot more to do than Raakhee-di who played the heroine. I got my first award for it. Then I got my second award for Majboor, a film written by Salimbhai and Javedbhai where Bachchan Saab played my brother. It was so heartening. Why would I want to be heroine when I was getting the stronger parts as the sister?"

She acted for over 40 years, only taking a break during 1983 and 1990 when she settled in Bangalore.

During the 1990s, Jalal had a part in many major hits in India, among them Raja Hindustani, Kuch Kuch Hota Hai, Dil To Pagal Hai, Kaho Naa... Pyaar Hai, Kabhi Khushi Kabhie Gham... and Dilwale Dulhania Le Jayenge, for which she won a Filmfare Award for Best Supporting Actress in 1995. Farida Jalal played the lead in the film Mammo. The film won the National Film Award for Best Feature Film in Hindi. Jalal won the Filmfare Critics Award for Best Performance. She acted in many television serials, such as the hit sitcom Dekh Bahi Dekh.

She was grandly acclaimed for her role in the 1994 film Mammo, for which she received the Filmfare Best Performance Award. Earlier, she was also nominated multiple times for 'Best Supporting Actress Award', one for the Amitabh Bachchan-Parveen Babi-Pran starrer Majboor where she played Amitabh's disabled sister.

Farida Jalal though, could not get a major break as heroine against any big star except Rajesh Khanna in Aaradhana, but she played the lead role in Jeevan Rekha in which her husband Tabrez was the hero. Pran and Ajit were also in the film. A song of the film; "Yaar mere, meri baahon me aaja" by Mohammed Rafi from this film had become popular, and is still popular.

Jalal starred in Shararat (Thoda Jadu, Thodi Nazaakat), in which she played a leading role. The comedy is currently airing on the Disney Channel.

In 2005, she co-hosted the 50th Filmfare Awards alongside Saif Ali Khan and Sonali Bendre, in Mumbai. In 2008, she made a special appearance in the Punjabi film Yaariyan. Recently, she appeared in the soap opera Balika Vadhu.

Farida Jalal did lot of Hindi dubbing for other actresses as well. Her notable work was for Swaroop Sampat (Naram Garam), Archana (Buddha Mil Gaya), Jaya Prada (Takkar).

In 2017, she was the victim of a death hoax. On 19 February, rumours did the rounds that she had died. Annoyed, the lady asked her publicist to put the rumours to rest.

Personal life 
Jalal was married to actor Tabrez Barmavar, who hailed from Bhatkal, Karnataka. She met her husband on the sets of Jeevan Rekha and fell in love in the course of the film and got married in November 1978. As she was not getting too many film offers after marriage, the couple moved to Bangalore where her husband had a soap factory business. They have a son named Yaseen. Her husband died in September 2003.

Filmography

Film

Television

Web

Awards and nominations

References

External links

Actresses in Hindi cinema
Living people
1949 births
Indian film actresses
Indian television actresses
Indian women television presenters
Indian television presenters
Actresses from New Delhi
Actresses in Tamil cinema
20th-century Indian actresses
21st-century Indian actresses
Actresses in Telugu cinema
Actresses in Hindi television
Filmfare Awards winners